The Musée national des douanes is a national museum on the history of French customs located at Place de la Bourse in the city of Bordeaux, France. The building was built in the 18th century to receive the new Ferme générale.

References 

Museums in Bordeaux
Museums established in 1984
Culture of Bordeaux
Customs services